Eannatum was a Sumerian Ensi (ruler or king) of Lagash circa 2500–2400 BCE. He established one of the first verifiable empires in history: he subdued Elam and destroyed the city of Susa as well as several other Iranian cities, and extended his domain to Sumer and Akkad. One inscription found on a boulder states that Eannatum was his Sumerian name, while his "Tidnu" (Amorite) name was Lumma.

Conquest of Sumer
Eannatum, grandson of Ur-Nanshe and son of Akurgal, was a king of Lagash who conquered all of Sumer, including Ur, Nippur, Akshak (controlled by Zuzu), Larsa, and Uruk (controlled by Enshakushanna, who is on the King List). 

He entered into conflict with Umma, waging a war over the fertile plain of Gu-Edin. He personally commanded an army to subjugate the city-state, and vanquished Ush, the ruler of Umma, finally making a boundary treaty with Enakalle, successor of Ush, as described in the Stele of the Vultures and in the Cone of Entemena: 

Eannatum made Umma a tributary, where every person had to pay a certain amount of grain into the treasury of the goddess Nina and the god Ingurisa.

Conquest outside Sumer

Eannatum expanded his influence beyond the boundaries of Sumer.  He conquered parts of Elam, including the city Az off the coast of the modern Persian Gulf, allegedly smote Shubur, and, having repulsed Akshak, he claimed the title of "King of Kish" (which regained its independence after his death) and demanded tribute as far as Mari:

Eannatum recorded his victories on a stone inscription:

However, revolts often arose in parts of his empire.  During Eannatum’s reign, many temples and palaces were built, especially in Lagash. The city of Nina, probably a precursor of Niniveh, was rebuilt, with many canals and reservoirs being excavated.

Stele of the Vultures

The so-called Stele of the Vultures, now in the Louvre, is a fragmented limestone stele found in Telloh, (ancient Girsu) Iraq, in 1881. It was erected as a monument of the victory of Eannatum of Lagash over Ush, king of Umma, leading to a boundary treaty with his successor Enakalle of Umma.

On it various incidents in the war are represented. In one register, the king (his name appears inscribed around his head) stands in front of his phalanx of heavily armoured soldiers, with a curved weapon in his right hand, formed of three bars of metal bound together by rings. In another register a figure, the king, his name again inscribed around his head, rides on his chariot in the thick of the battle, while his kilted followers, with helmets on their heads and lances in their hands, march behind him.

On the other side of the stele is an image of Ninurta, a god of war, holding the captive Ummaites in a large net. This implies that Eannatum attributed his victory to Ninurta, and thus that he was in the god's protection (though some accounts say that he attributed his victory to Enlil, the patron deity of Lagash).

The victory of Eannatum is mentioned in a fragmentary inscription on the stele, suggesting that after the loss of 3,600 soldiers on the field, Ush, king of Umma, was killed in a rebellion in his capital city of Umma: “[…] (Eanatum) defeated him. Its ( = Umma’s) 3600 corpses reached the base of heaven [...] raised (their) hands against him and killed him in Umma.”.

Other inscriptions

References

External links
 Eannatum, the Great. A brief history of Eannatum, the Alexander of his day.
 The Vulture Stele. A complete description and translation.

Kings of Lagash
25th-century BC Sumerian kings